Martin Speight (born 24 October 1967) is a former English cricketer. He was a right-handed batsman and a wicket-keeper. After his education at Hurstpierpoint College and St Chad's College, Durham University, he played for Sussex, Wellington and Durham in first-class cricket, before capping off a 17-year career with Northumberland.

He joined Sussex in 1986, playing two Youth Test matches the following calendar year, against Sri Lanka Young Cricketers. In July 1987, he participated in his debut Second XI Championship match, in a draw against Hampshire. Participating in the competition six more times over the next six years, he didn't appear again in the Second XI side until 2000, instead participating in the senior First XI with great frequency. He first played in the 1987 B&H Cup, continuing in that competition for five years, before playing in it for the last time in 1996.

He finished his career in 2003 for Northumberland, making his bow in the 2003 C&G Trophy. In 1992 Speight won the Walter Lawrence Trophy for the fastest first-class century. Following his retirement, he coached South Northumberland CC, moving between several schools as a cricket coach.

He is currently the head of both hockey, and cricket at Sedbergh School, a private boarding school in Cumbria. He hosts an annual 'Martin Speight Cricket academy', during the summer. He is also a commentator for BBC radio Newcastle for selected Durham fixtures.

References

External links
Martin Speight at CricketArchive 

1967 births
Living people
English cricketers
Durham cricketers
Sussex cricketers
People educated at Hurstpierpoint College
Wellington cricketers
Alumni of St Chad's College, Durham
Northumberland cricketers
Wicket-keepers